Sympistis heterogena is a species of moth in the family Noctuidae (the owlet moths).

The MONA or Hodges number for Sympistis heterogena is 10105.

References

Further reading

 
 
 

heterogena
Articles created by Qbugbot
Moths described in 1972